The Opponent is a sports drama film released in 2000. The film stars Erika Eleniak and James Colby.

Plot
When Patty Sullivan gets tired of the abuse of her boyfriend, she decides to take boxing lessons to protect herself. During her practices, she gains the attention of fellow boxer, June, and promoter, Fred. They introduce her to Tommy, a trainer that runs a local gym. Tommy takes Patty through a rigorous training program to prepare her for her first professional match.

Filming
The film was shot in several New York locations like Port Chester, Troy, and Waterford.

Cast
 Erika Eleniak as Patty Sullivan
 James Colby as Tommy
 Aunjanue Ellis as June
 John Doman as Fred
 Harry O'Reilly as Jack

Release
The film premiered at the AFI Film Festival on October 20, 2000. This was followed the same year by a premier on New York City.

External links

2000 films
2000s sports films
American boxing films
Films directed by Eugene Jarecki
Films about domestic violence
2000s English-language films
2000s American films